The Stade Marie-Marvingt (previously MMArena) is a multi-use stadium in Le Mans, France, that opened in January 2011. It is used mostly for football matches and hosted the home matches of Le Mans FC. The stadium has a capacity of 25,064 people. It replaced the Stade Léon-Bollée as the club's stadium.

The arena is located inside the Circuit de la Sarthe, home of the famous 24 Hours of Le Mans, and adjacent the first right kink on the Mulsanne Straight.

References

External links 

Stadium picture

Football venues in France
Le Mans FC
Sports venues in Sarthe
Sports venues completed in 2011
21st-century architecture in France